Francesco Scavullo (January 16, 1921 – January 6, 2004) was an American fashion photographer best known for his work on the covers of Cosmopolitan and his celebrity portraits.

Biography
Scavullo was born January 16, 1921, on Staten Island, New York City. He used his father's camera to photograph his sisters, who would model for him. He began working  for a studio that produced fashion catalogs and soon moved to Vogue. Scavullo spent three years as Horst P. Horst's assistant, studying Horst's techniques. He created a cover for Seventeen in 1948 that won him a contract with the magazine. Scavullo soon opened his own studio in Manhattan, and was married to model Carol McCallson from 1952 to 1955.

Scavullo's 1969 photograph of singer Janis Joplin with a cigarette in her hand was exhibited at the Amon Carter Museum in Fort Worth, Texas. The museum poster refers to Joplin, who died in 1970, as having a "free-spirited fervor of the counterculture revolution."

Some of Scavullo's more controversial work included a Cosmospolitan centerfold of a nude Burt Reynolds and photographs of a young Brooke Shields that some considered overly sexual. He also befriended a young teenager from Philadelphia, future supermodel Gia Carangi, whose career he was largely responsible for launching. When Carangi's heroin addiction made it impossible for her to find work later, Scavullo continued to employ and support her until her eventual death from complications of AIDS. Scavullo himself was diagnosed as manic-depressive.

Scavullo created shots for various movie posters, album covers and Broadway shows, including one for A Star is Born (featuring Barbra Streisand and Kris Kristofferson), Judy Collins' Hard Times for Lovers, a portrait of Julie Andrews for Blake Edwards' Victor Victoria,  the cover and poster photos of KISS' 1979 album Dynasty, photos of Donna Summer for her Once Upon A Time and Live and More double albums and later Summer: The Donna Summer Musical. In 1981, Scavullo was commissioned by Mikhail Baryshnikov to photograph the dancers of the American Ballet Theatre, which formed the basis of an exhibition that was later shown in a nationwide tour. In addition, he photographed the underground Warhol super star Tally Brown for his book Francesco Scavullo 1948-1984.

Scavullo photographed Duran Duran in the 1980s, with his work featured on various releases including the cover of "The Wild Boys" single. He appeared in the band's tour documentary Sing Blue Silver.

Scavullo's work has been used on the covers of Seventeen, Cosmopolitan, Harper's Bazaar, Interview, Newsweek and Rolling Stone. He published several books, from Scavullo on Beauty (1976) to Scavullo Nudes (2000).

Death
Scavullo died on January 6, 2004 of heart failure at the age of 82 while on his way to a New York photo shoot with a then up-and-coming CNN news anchor, Anderson Cooper. Scavullo was survived by his partner in life and art, Sean Byrnes.

Publications
 Scavullo on Beauty. Edited by Sean Byrnes. New York: Random House, 1976. 
 Scavullo on Men. With Sean Byrnes and Bob Colacello. New York: Random House, 1977. 
 Scavullo Women. With Sean Byrnes. New York: Harper and Row, 1982. 
 Scavullo: Francesco Scavullo Photographs 1948–1984. Edited by Sean Byrnes. New York: Harper and Row, 1984. 
 Scavullo: Photographs 50 Years. Introduction by Enid Nemy. New York: Harry N. Abrams, 1997. 
 Scavullo Nudes. Introduction by David Leddick. Edited by Ruth A. Peltason and Judith Hudson. New York: Harry N. Abrams, 2000. 
 Scavullo: Nudes. München: Knesebeck, 2000. 
 Scavullo: Les Nus. Paris: La Martinière, 2000.

References

External links

Commercial photographers
Fashion photographers
1921 births
2004 deaths
American gay artists
American LGBT photographers
Photographers from New York (state)
American people of Italian descent
People from Staten Island
20th-century American photographers
People with bipolar disorder
20th-century American LGBT people